Central Ohio Technical College (COTC) is a public technical college in Newark, Ohio, with extended campuses in Pataskala, Knox, and Coshocton. Founded in 1971, COTC shares a campus with Ohio State University at Newark and offers 31 associate degree programs and 12 certificate programs, including the Associate of Applied Science (A.A.S.), Associate of Applied Business (A.A.B.), and Associate of Technical Studies (A.T.S.) degrees.

Campuses

Newark
Six buildings make up COTC's Newark campus.  These include the  John and Christine Warner Library and Student Center, opened in August 2008, and the John Gilbert Reese Conference Center. The college's current enrollment on the Newark campus is approximately 2900.

Extended Campuses
COTC maintains campuses in Coshocton, Pataskala, Mount Vernon (Knox Campus) which, together, account for about one-third of the college's total enrollment.

References

External links
Official website

Newark, Ohio
Education in Licking County, Ohio
Buildings and structures in Licking County, Ohio
Community colleges in Ohio